Oliva ponderosa, common name the ponderous olive, is a species of sea snail, a marine gastropod mollusk in the family Olividae, the olives.

Description
The length of the shell varies between 45 mm and 73 mm.

Distribution
This marine species occurs off the Maldives, Mauritius and South India.

References

 Vervaet F.L.J. (2018). The living Olividae species as described by Pierre-Louis Duclos. Vita Malacologica. 17: 1-111

ponderosa
Gastropods described in 1840